Juan Luis Aldeguer Guirado (born August 27, 1979), nicknamed Juani, is a Spanish-born Filipino footballer who plays as either a central defender or a defensive midfielder.

Guirado only played in the lower leagues in Spain, amassing Segunda División B totals of 104 matches and one goal during seven seasons. His professional career was spent in the Philippines.

Guirado represented the Philippines at international level, earning 36 caps in four years.

Club career
Born in Málaga, Andalusia, Guirado spent most of his senior career in Segunda División B, playing for CD Don Benito, Burgos CF, UE Sant Andreu and UD Marbella. In late January 2012, he left Racing Lermeño in Tercera División and moved to the Philippines, signing with Global FC. On 6 February he made his official debut for his new team, coming in as a substitute midway through the second half of an eventual 1–0 win against Green Archers United FC.

On 26 February 2012, Guirado scored his first goal for Global in the United Football League, against Philippine Navy F.C. in a 5–0 victory. In late March, he agreed on a return to Lermeño for the following season.

Guirado signed with fellow league club CD Burgos in July 2013, under the condition he would still be able to play international football. He retired from competitive football in 2016 at the age of 36, his last team being Ceres–Negros F.C. in the United Football League. His last match was the 16-0 win against Pasargad F.C. on 11 June 2016, where he scored in the 77th minute; he cited family reasons for his decision, which he announced after the game.

In July 2016, Guirado came out of retirement and signed for Spanish amateurs Real Burgos CF.

International career
On 4 April 2011, it was reported that the Philippines national team was eying Guirado for the country's bid in the 2014 FIFA World Cup qualification campaign, but he was not able to suit up for the national squad because of prior commitments with Racing Lermeño. He only made his debut on 29 February 2012 in a friendly match against Malaysia, which ended in a 1–1 draw.

On 19 March 2012, during the third place play-off of the 2012 AFC Challenge Cup, Guirado scored his first international goal to give the Philippines a 4–2 lead over Palestine, in an eventual 4–3 win. On 28 March 2016, he announced his retirement as player and team captain of the Azkals, stating that the 2018 World Cup qualifier against North Korea the next day would be his last match.

International goals
Scores and results list the Philippines' goal tally first.

Personal life
Guirado was born to a Filipina mother who hailed from Ilagan, Isabela. His younger brother, Ángel, was also a footballer: a winger, he too spent most of his career in the Spanish third division, and also represented the Philippines internationally.

Guirado worked as a quality control inspector for PepsiCo in Burgos, while playing for Racing Lermeño.

Honours

International
Philippines
Philippine Peace Cup: 2013
AFC Challenge Cup third place: 2012

References

External links

1979 births
Living people
Spanish people of Filipino descent
Spanish sportspeople of Asian descent
Citizens of the Philippines through descent
Footballers from Málaga
Spanish footballers
Filipino footballers
Association football defenders
Association football midfielders
Association football utility players
Segunda División B players
Tercera División players
Divisiones Regionales de Fútbol players
Antequera CF footballers
Algeciras CF footballers
CE Mataró players
Burgos CF footballers
CF Reus Deportiu players
UE Sant Andreu footballers
Marbella FC players
Racing Lermeño players
Real Burgos CF footballers
Global Makati F.C. players
Ceres–Negros F.C. players
Philippines international footballers
Filipino expatriate footballers
Expatriate footballers in Spain